This is a list of films produced in Malaysia ordered by year of release in the 2000s.

For an alphabetical listing of Malaysian films see :Category:Malaysian films.

2000
 List of Malaysian films of 2000

2001
 List of Malaysian films of 2001

2002
 List of Malaysian films of 2002

2003
 List of Malaysian films of 2003

2004
 List of Malaysian films of 2004

2005
 List of Malaysian films of 2005

2006
 List of Malaysian films of 2006

2007
 List of Malaysian films of 2007

2008
 List of Malaysian films of 2008

2009
 List of Malaysian films of 2009

External links
Malaysian film at the Internet Movie Database
Malaysian Feature Films Finas
Cinema Online Malaysia

2000s
Lists of 2000s films
Films